Carmen de Patagones is the southernmost city in the .

Geography 

It is located 937 km southwest from the city of Buenos Aires, on the north bank of the Río Negro ("Black River"), near the Atlantic Ocean, and opposite Viedma, capital of the province of Río Negro. The city is the capital of the Patagones Partido, the only administrative division of Buenos Aires Province that lies within Patagonia.

History 

The town was founded in 1779 by Francisco de Viedma, an explorer leading a Spanish expedition commissioned with colonizing Patagonia's shores.

In the 19th century, Carmen de Patagones had a fort, and after the May Revolution of 1810, it became a prison for royalists (Spaniards and pro-Spanish locals against the independence movement).

Later, during the Cisplatine War (1825–1828), the town became a naval base, since the main Argentine safe harbour, the estuary of the Río de la Plata, had been blocked by Brazilian ships. The Brazilian troops attempted to take Carmen de Patagones, but they were repelled by armed residents on 7 March 1827; this date is still commemorated with a festival in the city.  The city maintains two imperial Brazilian flags captured during the battle in the central cathedral on the site of the original fort where the battle took place.

The town and its twin city, Viedma, became the focus of attention in 1986, when President Raúl Alfonsín announced the Patagonia Project, which envisaged the transfer of the nation's capital to a new federal district encompassing the two towns at the mouth of the Río Negro. Approved by the Congress in 1987, the plan was rescinded when Alfonsín's successor, President Carlos Menem, disbanded Entecap, the 
commission overseeing the project, in 1989.

See also

Carmen de Patagones school shooting
Battle of Carmen de Patagones

References

 
 Carmen de Patagones, la fiesta del 7 de marzo

Populated places in Buenos Aires Province
Populated places established in 1779
Tourist attractions in Buenos Aires Province
1779 establishments in the Spanish Empire
Cities in Argentina
Argentina